Saminaka is a town and headquarters of Lere Local Government Area and of Saminaka chiefdom of the Hausa people in southern Kaduna state in the North Central region of Nigeria. The postal code of the area is 811.

See also
 List of villages in Kaduna State

References

Populated places in Kaduna State